The Blue Danube is a 1926 German silent romance film directed by Frederic Zelnik and starring Harry Liedtke, Lya Mara and Hans Junkermann. The film has been described as a paean to Austria. It was shot at the Staaken Studios in Berlin. The film's art direction was by Andrej Andrejew and Jacek Rotmil who designed the sets.

Cast

References

Bibliography

External links

1926 films
1920s romance films
Films of the Weimar Republic
German romance films
German silent feature films
Films directed by Frederic Zelnik
Films set in Austria
German black-and-white films
1920s German films
Films shot at Staaken Studios